Enrique Gato Borregán (born 26 April 1977 in Valladolid, Castile and León) is a Spanish filmmaker and 3D/2D animation designer known as the creator of Tadeo Jones. With this character (including two CGI animated shorts and one animated feature) he won three Goya Awards.

Biography 
Gato was born in Valladolid and he grew up in Madrid. Since his childhood he was attracted to animation and technology, especially action-adventure Hollywood movies from variety of filmmakers, including the works of Steven Spielberg. When the first personal computers arrived, he began to make his own videogames with an Amstrad CPC 6128.

In 1995 he started his Informatics Engineering studies at university, where he learned to develop game engines to preview his own works and understand how to make 3D geometric previews using several programs like Maya, 3D Studio Max and Softimage.

While he was in university, he was hired by Artek, a company specializing in computer graphics. Once in there, he learned to work with programs such as TrueSpace and LightWave 3D, around the same time that Pixar was releasing its first works of CGI animation.

Filmography

References

External links 
 
 

Spanish film directors
Best Director Goya Award winners
1977 births
Living people